A sand island is an island that is mostly made of sand. The largest sand island in the world is Fraser Island, Australia. Other examples of large sand islands are Moreton, North Stradbroke and Bribie Islands which lie south of Fraser Island off the east coast of Brisbane, Australia.

References

Landforms